Chong Gum (born November 6, 1976) is a retired North Korean rhythmic gymnast.

She competed for the People's Republic of Korea in the individual rhythmic gymnastics all-around competition at the 1992 Olympic Games in Barcelona. She was 27th in the qualification round and didn't advance to the final.

References

External links 
 Chong Gum at Sports-Reference.com

1976 births
Living people
North Korean rhythmic gymnasts
Gymnasts at the 1992 Summer Olympics
Olympic gymnasts of North Korea